Dayane Jamille Carneiro dos Santos Pimentel (born 30 January 1986) better known as Dayane Pimentel is a Brazilian politician and professor. She has spent her political career representing Bahia, having served as federal deputy representative since 2019.

Personal life
Pimentel grew up in a liberal family, in her youth she was part of the city council campaign of her PT affiliated uncle. Before becoming a politician Pimentel worked as a college professor. Today she considers herself a "former leftist" and regards Jair Bolsonaro as her idol.

Political career
In the 2018 Brazilian general election, Pimentel was elected to the federal chamber of deputies with 136,742 votes, making her the fourth most voted candidate in the state of Bahia that election.

References 

1986 births
Living people
People from Feira de Santana
Brazilian educators
Social Liberal Party (Brazil) politicians
Members of the Chamber of Deputies (Brazil) from Bahia
Brazilian women in politics